Châteauneuf-de-Gadagne is a commune in the Vaucluse department in the Provence-Alpes-Côte d'Azur region in Southeastern France. In 2018, it had a population of 3,328.

History
The Félibrige was founded in Châteauneuf-de-Gadagne, at Font-Ségugne, in 1854.

Geography
Châteauneuf-de-Gadagne is located 12 km (7.4 mi) east of Avignon. It is served by Gadagne station (opened in 1868) on the line from Avignon to Miramas.

International relations

Châteauneuf-de-Gadagne is twinned with:
 Perroy, Switzerland

See also
Communes of the Vaucluse department

References

Communes of Vaucluse